Gaius Salonius Matidius Patruinus (died 78) was a Roman Senator who lived in the Roman Empire during the 1st century during the reign of Vespasian (r. 69–79).

Life 
Patruinus came from a wealthy family of Vicetia (modern Vicenza, northern Italy). Around 63, he married a noble Roman woman called Ulpia Marciana, the eldest sister of the future Emperor Trajan. On 4 July 68, Marciana bore him a daughter named Salonia Matidia. 

He served as a praetor and, through this position, became a senator. In 70/71, Patruinus possibly served as governor of Germania Superior. At the time of his death in 78, in Rome, Patruinus was a priest and served as a member of the Arval Brethren. After that, Marciana and Matidia went to live with Trajan and his wife Pompeia Plotina. 

Patruinus was the maternal grandfather to Matidia's daughters from her three marriages: Roman Empress Vibia Sabina, Hadrian's wife, and the noblewomen Matidia Minor (or Mindia Matidia) and Rupilia.

The Italian village of Matigge (ancient Matidiae) is named after him and his second granddaughter Matidia Minor.

Notes

References

Sources
 
 
 

1st-century Romans
78 deaths
Year of birth unknown
Senators of the Roman Empire
Nerva–Antonine dynasty